This is a list of available epics in the Kannada language (also called purana, in prose or poem), a South Indian language. Based on his research, the Kannada scholar L.S. Sheshagiri Rao claims that starting with the earliest available epic Adipurana by Pampa (939 C.E), Kannada writers have created a rich and active epic tradition. S.S. Bhusanurematha's Bhavyamanava (1983) is the latest in that tradition. Based on medieval Kannada literary sources, the Indologist Anthony Warder claims there were Kannada versions of the Ramayana and Mahabharata prior to 941 C.E., and Kavya (or Mahakavya, epic poems) such as Karnataka Kumarasambhava by Asaga (c. 850). According to the Kannada scholar R. Narasimhacharya, Chandraprabhapurana by Sri Vijaya, (court poet of King Amoghavarsha I) dates to the early 9th century.  This list is by no means exhaustive. In addition to the epics listed here, there are numerous epics written 'in part' (called khanda or mahatmaya) starting with the part rendering of the Skanda-purana by Kumarapadmarasa in c. 1180. According to Rao,

The list

See also
 Lists of Manipuri epics

Notes

References

 

 
Indian literature-related lists
Literature of Karnataka
Literature by language